Masterfile may refer to:

 Masterfile (album), an album by Icehouse
 MasterFILE, a database provided by EBSCO Information Services